Ludvigsen is a surname. Notable people with the surname include:

Bjarte Ludvigsen, a.k.a. Blue, record producer from Bergen, Norway
Gunvald Ludvigsen (born 1949), Norwegian politician for the Liberal Party
Ida Nyrop Ludvigsen (1927–1973), Danish translator and official
Inge Ludvigsen, born 10 March 1965, is a retired Norwegian footballer
Ingvard Ludvigsen (1904–1965), Danish boxer who competed in the 1928 Summer Olympics
Karl Ludvigsen (born 1934), American motoring journalist
Knutsen & Ludvigsen, Norwegian singing duo, Øystein Dolmen ("Knutsen") and Gustav Lorentzen ("Ludvigsen")
Ludvig Ludvigsen Daae (1834–1910), Norwegian historian
Malcolm Ludvigsen (born 1946), artist and scientist
Per-Ove Ludvigsen (born 1966), former Norwegian football player
Roger Ludvigsen (born 1965), Sami guitarist, percussionist and composer from Kautokeino
Sonja Ludvigsen (1928–1974), Norwegian politician, member of the Labour Party
Svein Ludvigsen (born 1946), Norwegian politician for the Conservative Party
Trond Fredrik Ludvigsen (born 1982), Norwegian footballer

See also
 Ludvig

Danish-language surnames
Norwegian-language surnames
Patronymic surnames
Surnames from given names